{{DISPLAYTITLE:C55H70MgN4O6}}
The molecular formula C55H70MgN4O6 (molar mass: 907.49 g/mol, exact mass: 906.5146 u) may refer to:

 Chlorophyll_b
 Chlorophyll_f

Molecular formulas